Sun Wei (20 November 1935 – 22 February 2019) was a Chinese civil engineer and an academician of the Chinese Academy of Engineering (CAE).

Biography
Sun was born in Jiaozhou, Shandong, on 20 November 1935. She graduated from the Nanjing Institute of Technology (now Southeast University) in July 1958 and became a faculty member. She joined the Communist Party of China in 1956.  She was promoted to associate professor in 1986 and to full professor in 1991. 

She published over 400 scientific papers and five monographs. In 2005, she was elected an academician of the Chinese Academy of Engineering (CAE). 

She died of an illness in Nanjing, Jiangsu, on 22 February 2019.

References

1935 births
People from Qingdao
2019 deaths
Southeast University alumni
Engineers from Shandong
Members of the Chinese Academy of Engineering
Chinese civil engineers
Academic staff of Southeast University
Chinese women engineers
Educators from Shandong